The London Intermediate Hurling Championship is a Gaelic Athletic Association cup competition between the second tier hurling clubs in London, England, organised by London GAA. In addition to four intermediate clubs, three senior clubs regularly submit 'B' teams into the competition. The competition's winner is promoted to the senior championship for the following year. St Declan's entered the championship for the first time in 2016.

The following teams competed in the 2022 championship:

Fulham Irish

Sean Treacy’s

Kilburn Gaels

St Gabriels 'B'

Cú Chulainns

Honours

References

Hurling competitions in the United Kingdom
Intermediate
Intermediate hurling county championships
Intermediate Hurling